Cilacap Station is the most southern railway station in Java, Indonesia. It is located in Sidakaya, South Cilacap, Cilacap Regency, Central Java.

This station is served by 2 passenger train that are Purwojaya, directing to Gambir via  and Wijayakusuma to Ketapang.

Services 
The following is a list of train services at the Cilacap Station

Passenger services 
 Purwojaya, destination  of  via 
 Wijayakusuma, destination of

Freight services 
 Avtur, destination of 

References

External links 
 

Cilacap Regency
Railway stations in Central Java